Dr Zoii Nath Sarmah is an Indian politician who has served as MLA from the Sipajhar (Vidhan Sabha constituency) constituency in Assam from 1991 to 2001 from Asom Gana Parishad ticket and he had joined Indian National Congress on 2016 and contested from Sipajhar constituency.

References 

Asom Gana Parishad politicians
Living people
Assam MLAs 1991–1996
Assam MLAs 1996–2001
Assam MLAs 2016–2021
Year of birth missing (living people)
Indian National Congress politicians from Assam